Abdul Azim Al-Aliwat (born 12 July 1967) is a Saudi Arabian athlete. He competed in the men's javelin throw at the 1988 Summer Olympics.

References

External links

1967 births
Living people
Athletes (track and field) at the 1988 Summer Olympics
Saudi Arabian male javelin throwers
Olympic athletes of Saudi Arabia
Place of birth missing (living people)